The Lakers–Clippers rivalry is a National Basketball Association (NBA) rivalry between the Los Angeles Lakers and Los Angeles Clippers.  The two Pacific Division teams both play their home games at Crypto.com Arena in Los Angeles, inspiring their matchups to sometimes be called the "Hallway Series" or "Battle of L.A.". The Lakers relocated from Minneapolis in 1960, while the Clippers moved from San Diego in 1984. While Los Angeles fans have historically favored the Lakers, the Clippers have sold out or filled capacity for every home game at Staples Center since Feb. 2011 and entered the 2016–17 season with the sixth-longest active sellout streak in the NBA. The Lakers have won 12 of their 17 NBA championships since moving to Los Angeles. Meanwhile, the Clippers have made the playoffs only eleven times since 1984 and were long considered the laughingstock of the NBA; they had never advanced past the second round of the playoffs until 2021. Some contended that the term rivalry was inaccurate until the Clippers became more successful. In 2012–13, the Clippers won the first of six straight season series against the Lakers.

The Lakers hold a 104–63 advantage in the all-time series. The two teams have never met in the playoffs. The Lakers lost a 3–1 series lead and failed to advance to the Western Conference semifinals against the Clippers in 2006, while the Clippers also lost a 3–1 lead against the Denver Nuggets in 2020, nixing a conference finals matchup with the eventual NBA champion Lakers.

History

1970–1984: Early years
The Lakers had existed in Los Angeles since 1960 after relocating there from Minneapolis, for which they had played in the NBA since 1948 since moving over from the NBL and won 5 championships there before the Clippers were founded in 1970 as the Buffalo Braves. They played in the Atlantic Division before moving to San Diego in 1978–79 and were renamed the Clippers, officially joining the Lakers in the Pacific Division. San Diego won in their first game against the Lakers, winning 124–113 on October 24, 1978. "This is a good way to start off a rivalry", said Clippers owner Irv Levin afterwards.
Nevertheless, both teams are good teams.

1984: First years together in Los Angeles
The Lakers were joined by the Clippers in Los Angeles in 1984 after six seasons in San Diego. After the Clippers move, the teams drew a crowd of 14,991 in their first meeting at the Sports Arena; it was the then-largest home-court attendance in Clippers history. The fans were evenly divided in their support of the two teams. The Lakers won 108–103, and the Associated Press (AP) wrote that "a crosstown rivalry was born". Former Lakers guard Norm Nixon, then in his second year with the Clippers, said "I think it's going to great every time we play ... When we get some more [wins], our fans won't have to cover their heads with their hats anymore." The Clippers marketed themselves as the "People's Team" with ticket prices ($4, $8, $12, and $15) that were lower than the Lakers ($7, $9.50, $13.50, and $27.50 and above). Lakers coach Pat Riley commented, "I felt we've done more the last 20 years to be the 'People's Team'"

1984–2013: Lakers success and Clippers struggles

By 1986, the Lakers were still undefeated against the Clippers, and AP offered that it was "a crosstown rivalry that hasn't been much of one." Lakers fans would outnumber Clippers fans at the Sports Arena during the teams' matchups for years until 1992, when the Clippers had their first winning season since 1978–79 and their first playoff appearance since 1976. The Lakers, on the other hand, struggled in 1991–92 with Lakers great Magic Johnson's retirement after he tested positive for HIV. The Clippers ended a 27-game Forum losing streak against the Lakers that season, and they finished with a better record than the Lakers. They again finished ahead of the Lakers in 1992–93. They also won the season series against the Lakers for the first time since moving to Los Angeles. It was also their first as a franchise since 1974–75, when they were still the Buffalo Braves. In 1993–94, both teams missed the playoffs marking the first time that both teams had missed the postseason in the same season, a feat that was later repeated in the 2004–2005 season, when the Clippers finished 37-45 and the Lakers finished 34–48.

From the 1994–95 to 1998–99 seasons, the Clippers played a limited number of home games at the Arrowhead Pond of Anaheim. In those seasons, the Clippers played the Lakers at the Pond only three times, compiling a record of 1–2 against the Lakers in Anaheim. A deal to move the Clippers to Anaheim on a permanent basis was declined by the team in 1996, leading to the eventual decision to have the Clippers join the Lakers at the Staples Center when it opened in 1999.

The Clippers did not finish ahead of the Lakers again until 2004–05. Lakers star Kobe Bryant almost joined the Clippers that season as a free agent before re-signing with the Lakers. The Clippers in 2005–06 won 47 games and finished two games ahead of the Lakers. During the season, Bryant said that "rivalries are made in the playoffs, not in the regular season". In the 2006 playoffs, the Lakers built a 3–1 first-round series lead against the Phoenix Suns before losing 4–3, spoiling a potential crosstown matchup with the Clippers in the second round. The Clippers’ second-round series against Phoenix drew higher television ratings in Southern California than the Lakers’ first-round loss to Phoenix. They missed the conference finals by one game, losing 4–3 to the Suns.

Prior to a matchup in 2008 with the Lakers at 3–0 and the Clippers 0–4, the Los Angeles Times wrote that "even the involved parties have trouble referring to this thing as a rivalry." Lakers coach Phil Jackson said the two teams were "always going to be a rivalry" yet on many occasions, he picked on the Clippers' often poor record.

2013–2019: Roles reversed

Starting with the 2010–11 season, Blake Griffin, with his highlight reel plays, helped draw interest in the Clippers. A turning point in the rivalry occurred before the following season, when the Lakers thought they had acquired Chris Paul in a trade from the New Orleans Hornets, but commissioner David Stern vetoed the trade and Paul was instead traded to the Clippers. Prior to Paul's arrival, the Clippers had the worst overall winning percentage in the NBA (.349) since they moved to Los Angeles, while the Lakers during that same period had the best (.659).

In a game that season between the two teams won by the Clippers, tempers flared and seven technical fouls were called. Although it was a home game for the Clippers at Staples, Clippers fans were still outnumbered by Lakers fans. In a heated rematch won by the Lakers, ESPN wrote, "If the Staples co-tenants didn't have a rivalry before [the game], they have one now." Paul was upset after the game that Lakers forward Pau Gasol touched him on the head. "...don't touch the top of my head like I'm one of your kids", warned Paul. Some Clippers in 2012 denied that a rivalry existed. Griffin offered that "a rivalry has to be evenly matched, and this one hasn't been over the years." Clippers center DeAndre Jordan said the Lakers "are proven. They have more championships. They have Hall of Famer players. We're still a young team."

The Clippers in 2011–12 had a winning record for only the third time since Donald Sterling bought the team in 1981 and made the playoffs for only the fifth time since moving to Los Angeles. The Clippers led the Lakers by  games in mid-February before the Lakers overtook them by one game for the Pacific Division title.

For the first time in 2012–13, the Clippers, like the Lakers, had reasonable expectations to win an NBA championship. The Clippers signed former Lakers Ronny Turiaf, Matt Barnes, and Lamar Odom, who joined Caron Butler as Clippers who had played for the Lakers. Coach Mike Brown of the 0–2 Lakers called the 1–0 Clippers "a better team" prior to their first meeting. He added, "It's sort of a rivalry now, and so it will probably be a physical game." However, Brown likened the Clippers to his Cleveland Cavaliers teams with LeBron James trying to form a rivalry with the Boston Celtics despite Cleveland's lack of championships. Lakers fans booed the Clippers during warmups and player introductions, which Griffin did not witness before during his rookie season. He said Lakers fans "didn't really care" about the Clippers before, and he attributed the newfound attention to his team's turnaround. The Clippers won the game, dropping the Lakers to 0–3 for the first time in 34 years. The game was televised by ESPN and drew a 5.9 rating in Los Angeles, the network's highest-rated regular season game ever in the L.A. market. The Clippers later defeated the defending NBA champions, the Miami Heat, but the city was more engrossed in the Lakers' firing of Brown and the hiring of Mike D'Antoni. Heat coach Erik Spoelstra subsequently called the Clippers "legit contenders for the title", while Arash Markazi of  ESPN.com called them "the best team in L.A." Prior to their second meeting that season, the Clippers were 25–8 and fighting for the best record in the league, while the Lakers were 15–16—nine games behind the Clippers—and looking to secure a playoff spot in the Western Conference. For only the fourth time in their prior 127 meetings since they moved to Los Angeles, the Clippers had a better record than the Lakers entering their matchup when both teams had played 30 or more games. Prior to the game, Bryant called the Clippers "top contenders" for a championship. The Clippers won 107–102 in a nationally televised game that gave ESPN its best NBA regular-season overnight rating (2.7) in nearly two years. The local Los Angeles rating of 5.7 was the second highest ever behind the record set in the teams' previous meeting. The Clippers also won their third meeting, 125–101, after starting the game with a 15–0 lead. The win clinched the season series for the Clippers for the first time in 20 years since 1992–93. On April 7, the Clippers defeated the Lakers 109–95, clinching their first Pacific Division title in franchise history. The Lakers had won 23 of the previous 42 division titles. The win also completed a season sweep of the Lakers, 4–0. The franchise had not swept the Lakers since 1974–75, when they were in Buffalo. While both teams qualified for the playoffs that season, they were both eliminated in the first round, as the Lakers were swept by the San Antonio Spurs, and the Clippers lost in six games to the Memphis Grizzlies. It would be the Lakers last playoff appearance until 2020, their longest postseason drought in franchise history.

The Clippers in 2013–14 hired former Clippers player Doc Rivers as their new coach. He previously coached the Boston Celtics, whom the Los Angeles Times called "the Lakers' true rivals", where he won one NBA Finals and lost another in the Celtics–Lakers rivalry. Rivers said that Los Angeles "always will be" a Lakers town, but he also predicted that people that moved from the East Coast to L.A. would root for the Clippers if they won an NBA title. On January 10, 2014, the Clippers avenged a 13-point season opener loss to the Lakers with a 123–87 blowout in their next meeting.  At the time, the 36-point margin was the Clippers' largest ever against the Lakers, who were near the bottom of the conference standing and losers for the tenth time in 11 games, a bad stretch they had not duplicated since they last missed the playoffs in 2004–05. On March 6, the Clippers defeated the Lakers 142–94; the 48-point margin was the largest victory ever by the Clippers against any opponent, as well as the most one-sided defeat in Lakers history. While the Clippers went on to win the Pacific Division title and qualify for the playoffs, the Lakers finished with one of the worst records in the Western Conference, with a record of 27–55, a stark contrast from previous years, and starting an era of futility for the Lakers. In the playoffs, the Clippers defeated the Golden State Warriors in seven games in the first round, but would lose to the Oklahoma City Thunder in six games in the semifinals.

After the 2013–14 season, D'Antoni resigned as Lakers coach, and the team replaced him with Byron Scott, a former guard from their Showtime era. The Clippers underwent an ownership change after Steve Ballmer purchased the team from Sterling, whose racist comments prompted his wife to sell the team against his wishes. Scott stated that there was still no rivalry with the Clippers. "Celtics-Lakers, that's a rivalry", he said. On April 5, 2015, the Clippers won its sixth straight against the Lakers for their longest winning streak in the series in the franchise's history. The 106–78 win was also the fewest points they had ever allowed to the Lakers. It was the Lakers' 56th loss of the season, which surpassed the team high established the year before, when they finished with a 27–55 record. In the playoffs, the Clippers were leading the Houston Rockets 3–1 in the conference semifinals, but became just the ninth team in NBA history with that lead to lose the series. Earlier in the series, former Lakers player Magic Johnson had thought that the Clippers could win the championship. However, after they were eliminated, he stated: "I was wrong. The Clippers are still the Clippers."

Entering the 2018–19 season, the Clippers had won the last six season series against the Lakers. After acquiring free agent LeBron James, the Lakers hoped to re-establish their dominance in Los Angeles and were expected to end their five-year playoff drought. However, entering the clubs' March 2019 matchup, the Lakers were  games behind for the eighth and final playoff berth in the West, and five behind the No. 7 Clippers. The Clippers won 113–105.

2019–present: Potential playoff meeting
Both the Lakers and Clippers made major offseason moves entering 2019–20. The Lakers acquired Anthony Davis from the New Orleans Pelicans, while the Clippers signed free agent Kawhi Leonard and traded for Paul George from the Oklahoma City Thunder. The Lakers, who had also been interested in Leonard, held up the Davis trade after Leonard asked them to wait on his decision on possibly pairing with James and Davis. The Lakers also hired Frank Vogel to replace Luke Walton as their head coach. Tyronn Lue, who won two NBA championships as a player with the Lakers in 2000 and 2001 and coached Cleveland to an NBA title with James in 2016, was the frontrunner for the Lakers' position, but he wanted a longer-term deal and rejected the team's three-year offer. He instead joined the Clippers as an assistant.

The Clippers became a popular pick to win the NBA championship. Their marketing campaign sold the team's grit over the Lakers' Hollywood glitz with slogans including "Streetlights Over Spotlights". In his 2021 book Inside the NBA Bubble: A Championship Season under Quarantine, the Lakers Jared Dudley, who played for the Clippers in 2013–14, recalled that the Lakers were motivated by the Clippers' billboard campaign, and he said the Lakers felt disrespected that George called Leonard and himself the top duo in the league, ahead of James and Davis.  Both teams were predicted all season long to reach the Western Conference finals. The NBA placed marquee matchups between them on opening night and on Christmas Day, with the Clippers winning both. At the trade deadline in February 2020, both teams vied to acquire Marcus Morris from the New York Knicks, but the Clippers prevailed as the Lakers had limited assets to trade as a result of the Davis deal. The Lakers acquired his twin brother, Markieff Morris, later in the month.

The Lakers ended the regular season with the best record in the Western Conference, while the Clippers finished second. The Lakers advanced to the Conference Finals after eliminating Houston 4–1, and they awaited the winner of the other semifinals series, where the Clippers were up 3–2 at the time against the Denver Nuggets. However, the Clippers were eliminated 4–3, blowing a 3–1 series lead after being up in the final three games by 16, 19, and 12 points, respectively. The Lakers advanced to the Finals for the first time since 2010, where they defeated Miami 4–2 for their 17th NBA title, tying the Celtics for the most in league history.

During the offseason, Clippers free agent Montrezl Harrell, who was the reigning NBA Sixth Man of the Year, signed a two-year contract for the mid-level exception to join the Lakers. The Clippers replaced Rivers as head coach with his assistant Lue. Despite losing Leonard in the playoffs after a partial tear of the anterior cruciate ligament in his right knee, they advanced to the Western Conference Finals for the first time in franchise history. In 2021–22, the Lakers added Russell Westbrook to team with James and Davis, and were again favorites to win the West, while the Clippers expected Leonard to be out for most of the season after knee surgery. The Clippers swept the season series with the Lakers and extended their winning streak in the rivalry to seven. They were 32–7 against the Lakers since 2012–13.

Crypto.com Arena

Crypto.com Arena (known as the Staples Center from 1999 to 2021) has been the home arena of both teams since 1999. Their locker rooms are  down a concrete-floored hallway from one another, inspiring the series between the two to sometimes be referred to as the "Hallway Series". The name is patterned after other notable crosstown rivalries such as baseball's Subway Series in New York, Crosstown Series in Chicago and the Freeway Series in Los Angeles.

The Lakers' locker room is larger than the Clippers’. The arena's seats were originally colored purple, the primary color of the Lakers, as well as the primary colors at the time of construction for the Los Angeles Kings, the National Hockey League (NHL) team that also shares Staples. However, the seats were replaced with black ones in 2005. The Clippers are the only one of the four Staples tenants without any banners hanging to commemorate championships or retired numbers (the team electing to place the banners for their two division titles in their practice facility instead of the Crypto.com Arena).

Starting in the 2013–14 season, during their home games, the Clippers cover the Lakers' banners, which was the Clippers' new coach Doc Rivers' idea. Prior to that season, Lakers banners were previously visible in the rafters even during Clippers games. Lakers games feature dramatic lighting made possible by additional lights purchased by the Lakers. Through the 2013–14 season, the same experience was not provided during Clippers games; however, new LED lights were installed for the Clippers and Kings prior to their 2014–15 seasons that produced a similar effect to the Lakers' lighting.

Hollywood celebrities are often present at Lakers games, most notably Jack Nicholson, while the most recognizable Clipper fan at times is superfan Clipper Darrell. "We do at times feel like the stepchild", said player DeAndre Jordan. "But at the same time, those guys have been highly successful. They have banners in their arena." Citing the energy of Clippers fans, Bryant called away games against the Clippers at Crypto.com Arena his second favorite venue behind Madison Square Garden, the home of the New York Knicks.

During exhibition games in December 2012 between the two teams, courtside seats with the Lakers as the designated home team were sold at $2,750, while the same seats at the Clippers home game days later went for $1,100. Before the arrival of Griffin and Paul, both among the top players in the NBA, the Clippers would market their opponents' star players to improve ticket sales. As attractive as the Clippers were becoming, it was hard to overcome Los Angeles' affection for the Lakers that had spanned over 50 years. For the 2015–16 season, the Clippers will be charging more than the Lakers for their top courtside seats. The Clippers' top tickets will cost $2,840 each—which include food, parking, and admission to an exclusive Clippers hospitality room—while the Lakers' remained at $2,750 without food or parking.

The Lakers and Clippers often play doubleheaders at Crypto.com Arena, having played back-to-back games on the same day almost 60 times as of 2012. Separate admission is required for each game, with each team playing a different opponent. In between games, the court is reassembled with the respective home team's floor, which differ only in their paint scheme. The Clippers, who have only third priority behind the Lakers and Kings for arena  scheduling, typically play the less preferable day game in a league where players and coaches are more familiar playing at night. Outside of Los Angeles, the last doubleheader in the NBA was in 1972 at Seattle Center Coliseum, when the Portland Trail Blazers played the Houston Rockets and the Seattle SuperSonics played the Philadelphia 76ers.

The Clippers' lease at Crypto.com Arena ends in 2024. In July 2020, the team received city approval for their proposed Intuit Dome. However, the Lakers' lease at the Crypto.com Arena was extended until 2041.

Annual finishes

Head-to-head

Common players

The following players have played for both the Lakers and Clippers:

 Matt Barnes
 Brandon Bass
 Benoit Benjamin
 Mario Bennett
 Patrick Beverley
Steve Blake
 Avery Bradley
 Tony Brown
 Reggie Bullock
 Caron Butler
 Doug Christie
 Darren Collison
 Lester Conner
 Brian Cook
 Larry Drew
 Jared Dudley
 James Edwards
 Jordan Farmar
 Wenyen Gabriel
 Ron Harper
 Montrezl Harrell
 Antonio Harvey
 Antawn Jamison
 Wesley Johnson
 DeAndre Jordan
 Chris Kaman
 Darius Morris
 Norm Nixon
 Lamar Odom
 Smush Parker
 Ruben Patterson
 Josh Powell
 Vladimir Radmanović
 Glen Rice
 David Rivers
 Rajon Rondo
 Sean Rooks
 Kareem Rush
 Mike Smrek
 Lance Stephenson
 Derek Strong
 Ronny Turiaf
 Sasha Vujacic
 Von Wafer
 Russell Westbrook
 Jamaal Wilkes
 Lou Williams
 Nick Young
 Ivica Zubac

Notes

References
General

Specific

External links
Los Angeles Lakers vs. Los Angeles Clippers All-Time Head-to-Head Record in the NBA at LandOfBasketball.com
Lakers official site at NBA.com
Clippers official site at NBA.com

Los Angeles Clippers
Los Angeles Lakers
National Basketball Association rivalries
1970 establishments in California